The West Seti Dam is a proposed hydroelectric dam on the Seti River in the Far-Western Development Region of Nepal. All project sites, excluding the reservoir area and transmission line corridor, are located in either Doti and/or Dadeldhura Districts. The reservoir area is located in Doti, Dadeldhura, Baitadi and Bajhang Districts. The transmission line corridor is located in Doti, Dadeldhura, Kailali and Kanchanpur districts.

Design
The dam's catchment area covers the upper  of the Seti River Basin and its reservoir volume would be  of which  would be active (or "useful") storage. The power station would have a rated capacity of 750 MW.

Background
The dam was to be built by Snowy Mountain Engineering Corporation (SMEC) under West Seti Hydropower Company Limited (WSHPL). However, in June 2011 the Government of Nepal terminated the construction license after SMEC's decision to stop funding & it was linked to the lack of interest shown by CMEC and ADB to pour in money in the mega project. In 2010, WSHPL has lost two important investors, the Asian Development Bank and China National Machinery and Equipment Import and Export Corporation. A campaign by organizations opposing the dam also impacted construction. The dam is opposed based on its impact of the environment and relocation of residents. In May 2011, China Three Gorges Corporation (CTGC) has expressed its interest in developing the project. In December 2011, Nepal's Ministry of Energy proposed a public–private partnership after CTGC's interest. An official stated "The government is committed to construct the project at any cost".

References

Proposed hydroelectric power stations
Hydroelectric power stations in Nepal
Dams in Nepal
Concrete-face rock-fill dams
Proposed renewable energy power stations in Nepal
National Pride Projects
Buildings and structures in Bajhang District